Himanshu Pandya is an Indian Professor and academic who currently serves as Vice Chancellor of Gujarat University, Ahmedabad, Gujarat, India. He earned a MSc and PhD in Botany and areas of specialization In vivo and In vitro studies on physiological and biochemical parameters on Gladiolus, Chrysanthemum and Lily.

Career 
He taught for 27 years. He is also a Professor and Head of the Department of Biochemistry and Forensic Science. His research focused on Horticulture, Plant Biotechnology, Plant physiology, Plant Biochemistry, Bioinformatics, Climate Change and Impacts Management, Forensic Science, and Biochemistry.

From 2005 - 2017 he was a Professor in the Department of Botany, Bioinformatics and Climate Change Impacts Management.

In 2017 he became Vice Chancellor of the Gujarat University.

Recognition and awards 

 1st Prize (Senior Category) for Prof. B. M. Johari Rolling Shield Paper Presentation Contest, Delhi University, Delhi-1994-95.
 Outstanding Achievement Award, Gujarat University Botanical Society (GUBS), Gujarat University, Ahmedabad-1995-1996.
 Nominated for the State Award for Dr. Vikram Sarabhai Young Scientist Award, 1999, (GUJCOST), Government of Gujarat, Gandhinagar.
 Best Paper (Poster) and cash prize in XXVIth International Horticultural Congress (IHC-2002), Toronto, Canada. 2002.

References 

Living people
Academic staff of Gujarat University
Year of birth missing (living people)
Botany